Williamsport High School is a public high school in Williamsport, Washington County,  Maryland, United States.

Baseball team 

The school's baseball team, and its coach David Warrenfeltz, were the subject of a 2012 Sports Illustrated article.  In a story written by Chris Ballard, Warrenfeltz discussed events affecting the team in early 2012 when the team's star pitcher and his prom date were killed in an automobile accident.  Despite the loss, the team rallied to win the Maryland state high school championship.   Warrenfeltz was also a close friend and teammate of former Los Angeles Angels pitcher Nick Adenhart, who was killed in an automobile accident in 2009. Both Warrenfeltz and Adenhart graduated from Williamsport High School.

Notable alumni
 Nick Adenhart, late Los Angeles Angels of Anaheim starting pitcher 
 Gina Marie Groh, United States District Court Judge
 Dave Cole, former Major League Baseball pitcher

References

External links

Public high schools in Maryland
Public schools in Washington County, Maryland
1970 establishments in Maryland
Educational institutions established in 1970